Zenit is a Saint Petersburg Metro station on the Nevsko-Vasileostrovskaya Line (Line 3) of the Saint Petersburg Metro. It opened on May 26, 2018 as Novokrestovskaya as part of the extension of the line to the north from Primorskaya. This extension also included the Begovaya station. Zenit is located between Primorskaya and Begovaya. Till 10 June 2021, the station was temporarily closed since April 2, 2020 as part of the measures taken against the COVID-19 pandemic.
 
The station is situated at the western tip of Krestovsky Island, close to Krestovsky Stadium. The extension of the line had been tied to the 2018 FIFA World Cup, which partly took place at this stadium in summer 2018.

On August 19, 2020 the station, while still closed, was renamed Zenit as a result of lobbying efforts of FC Zenit Saint Petersburg.

Entrances and time
Entrance 1 (South) opens on game days only

Entrance 2 opens on weekends and game days

On week days station is closed unless this is a gameday or another event on Gazprom Arena

References 

Saint Petersburg Metro stations
Railway stations in Russia opened in 2018
Railway stations located underground in Russia